Thomas Ulric Neck (January 10, 1939 – May 5, 2017) was a professional American football player. He played as a defensive back in the National Football League (NFL) for the Chicago Bears for one game, in 1962. He was selected by the Bears in the 18th round of the 1962 NFL draft and was also selected by the Boston Patriots of the American Football League (AFL) in the 20th round of the 1962 AFL draft. He attended Louisiana State University, where he played college football for the LSU Tigers football team. Neck was born in Marksville, Louisiana and attended Marksville High School. He died in 2017, aged 78.

References

1939 births
2017 deaths
people from Marksville, Louisiana
Players of American football from Louisiana
American football defensive backs
LSU Tigers football players
Chicago Bears players